Jonathan Edward Pease (born 8 June 1952 in Northumberland, England) is a member of the prominent Pease family and a Thoroughbred racehorse trainer.

The son of Derrick Allix Pease and the Hon. Rosemary Portman, his grandfather was Sir Richard Arthur Pease, 2nd Baronet of the Pease Baronets, of Hammersknott. After studying at Eton College and Cambridge University, Jonathan Pease began learning the business of conditioning Thoroughbreds for racing in England under the tutelage of Toby Balding and Clive Brittain. He relocated to the United States where he worked for  MacKenzie Miller and in Australia learned under  trainer  T. J. Smith. In 1976 he went to work for French trainer, François Mathet and in 1979 took up permanent residence in France where he obtained his trainer's licence and set up a public stable at the Chantilly Racecourse.

Pease raced horses in both European and U.S. events notably winning two Breeders' Cup races.

Jonathan Pease married Mary Dutton with whom he has daughters Catherine Annie (b. 1982), Victoria Margaret (b. 1983), and Alice Rosie (b. 1991).

References
Jonathan Pease at the NTRA

1952 births
British racehorse trainers
Living people
Jonathan Pease
People educated at Eton College
People from Northumberland
Jonathan Pease